LAHDC is an abbreviation of "Ladakh Autonomous Hill Development Council". It may refer to:

 Ladakh Autonomous Hill Development Council, Kargil
 Ladakh Autonomous Hill Development Council, Leh